Mazhar Khaleghi (born 9 September 1938) is a Kurdish singer of Iran's Kurdistan region, famous for his folklore Kurdish music. He currently resides in the United Kingdom.

Biography
Khaleqi was born on 9 September 1938 in the city of Sanandaj, Iran. He started to sing when he was in primary school at the age of eight. The school music teacher gave him extra courses to teach him to read notes, and also learn Kurdish and Persian modes (Maqam). He got more music lessons from Kurdish master musician Hassan Kamkar, the father of the renowned musicians and performers, the Kamkars.

At the age of twelve, Mazhar was invited to sing on the town radio in Sanandaj. He soon became well known in all regions which were covered by radio signals. He performed weekly for nearly seven years. Unfortunately all performances were live and there are no recordings except for a few from 1958.

Mazhar Khaleqi left his hometown to study in Tehran University in the summer of 1958. He started a new career with Radio Tehran. The rich Kurdish folksong and his background helped him to become close friends with  Iranian conductors such as Hananeh, Kasravi, Tajvidi, Yousefzamani, Mirzadeh, and Naseri.

He has recorded more than 150 pieces of Kurdish folk melodies with several types of orchestras, such as the Tehran Symphonic, Cultural Ministry and the Radio Tehran Orchestras.
He left Iran after the Iranian Revolution  when any type of music not containing Islamic verses was declared sinful. Before leaving Iran he recorded an album of twelve songs for his people.

Mazhar continued with music in exile and gave his oppressed nation hope and happiness in the hardest of times, when the Iraqi regime started to commit genocide on the Kurds.

Kurdish identity 
In reply to a question on how the Kurds can achieve their cultural and political rights within the four countries with a Kurdish population — Iran, Iraq, Syria and Turkey — Khaliqi said, “Given globalization, it is inevitable that there would be compromises. I do not mean in political terms, but in art and culture. We should not let our traditions fade away in the globalized world. On the contrary, we should use globalization and technology to take our music and our culture beyond the Middle East.”

Books
Karavan-i Mihr (2001)

See also
 Kurdish music
 Kurdish people
 List of Kurdish musical artists

References

External links

 Mazhar Khaleghi

Iranian Kurdish people
Kurdish-language singers
1938 births
People from Sanandaj
Living people